Anosov (masculine) or Anosova (feminine) is a Russian surname. Notable people with the surname include:
Anosov Pavel Petrovich - Russian scientist-metallurgist
Dmitri Anosov (1936–2014), Russian Soviet mathematician
Anosov diffeomorphism
Nikolai Anosov (1900–1962), Soviet conductor
Vitaly Anosov (born 1977), Uzbekistani canoeist

Metallurg Anosov, later renamed to Anosov - Soviet merchant freighter, tweendecker, one of the Leninsky Komsomol class of cargo ships. This cargo ship was buil in 1959.

Russian-language surnames